In physics, the scallop theorem states that a swimmer that exhibits time-symmetric motion cannot achieve net displacement in a low-Reynolds number Newtonian fluid environment, i.e. a fluid that is highly viscous. Such a swimmer deforms its body into a particular shape through a sequence of motions and then reverts to the original shape by going through the sequence in reverse. This is known as reciprocal motion and is invariant under time-reversal. Edward Mills Purcell stated this theorem in his 1977 paper Life at Low Reynolds Number explaining physical principles of aquatic locomotion. The theorem is named for the motion of a scallop which opens and closes a simple hinge during one period. Such motion is not sufficient to create migration at low Reynolds numbers. The scallop is an example of a body with one degree of freedom to use for motion. Bodies with a single degree of freedom deform in a reciprocal manner and subsequently, bodies with one degree of freedom do not achieve locomotion in a highly viscous environment.

Background

The scallop theorem is a consequence of the subsequent forces applied to the organism as it swims from the surrounding fluid. For an incompressible Newtonian fluid with density  and dynamic viscosity , the flow satisfies the Navier–Stokes equations:

,

where  denotes the velocity of the swimmer. However, at the low Reynolds number limit, the inertial terms of the Navier-Stokes equations on the left-hand side tend to zero. This is made more apparent by nondimensionalizing the Navier–Stokes equations.

.

where the dimensionless pressure is appropriately scaled for flow with significant viscous effects. Plugging these quantities into the Navier-Stokes equations gives us:

And by rearranging terms, we arrive at a dimensionless form:

,

where  is the Reynolds number. In the low Reynolds number limit (as ), the LHS tends to zero and we arrive at a dimensionless form of Stokes equations. Redimensionalizing yields:

.

What are some of the consequences of having no inertial terms at low Reynolds number? One consequence means that the swimmer experiences virtually no net force or torque. A second consequence tells us that the velocity is linearly proportional to the force (same can be said about angular velocity and torque). Other consequences lead to special properties of the Stokes equations. Stokes equations are linear and independent of time. These properties lead to kinematic reversibility, an important property of a body in motion at the low Reynolds number limit. Kinematic reversibility means that any instantaneous reversal of the forces acting on the body will not change the nature of the fluid flow around it, simply the direction of the flow. These forces are responsible for producing motion. When a body has only one degree of freedom, reversal of forces will cause the body to deform in a reciprocal fashion. For instance, a scallop opening its hinge will simply close it to try to achieve propulsion. Since the reversal of forces does not change the nature of the flow, the body will move in the reverse direction in the exact same manner, leading to no net displacement. This is how we arrive at the consequences of the scallop theorem.

Mathematical proof

The proof of the scallop theorem can be represented in a mathematically elegant way. To do this, we must first understand the mathematical consequences of the linearity of Stokes equations. To summarize, the linearity of Stokes equations allows us to use the reciprocal theorem to relate the swimming velocity of the swimmer to the velocity field of the fluid around its surface (known as the swimming gait), which changes according to the periodic motion it exhibits. This relation allows us to conclude that locomotion is independent of swimming rate. Subsequently, this leads to the discovery that reversal of periodic motion is identical to the forward motion due to symmetry, allowing us to conclude that there can be no net displacement.

Rate-independence
The reciprocal theorem describes the relationship between two flows in the same geometry where inertial effects are insignificant compared to viscous effects. Consider a fluid filled region  bounded by surface  with a unit normal . The velocity fields harbor corresponding stress fields  and  respectively. Then the following equality holds:

.

The reciprocal theorem allows us to obtain information about a certain flow by using information from another flow. This is preferable to solving Stokes equations, which is difficult due to not having a known boundary condition. This particularly useful if one wants to understand flow from a complicated problem by studying the flow of a simpler problem in the same geometry.

One can use the reciprocal theorem to relate the swimming velocity, of a swimmer subject to a force  to its swimming gait :

.

Now that we have established that the relationship between the instantaneous swimming velocity in the direction of the force acting on the body and its swimming gait follow the general form

,

where  and  denote the positions of points
on the surface of the swimmer, we can establish that locomotion is independent of rate. The net displacement of the swimmer is

.

Now consider the swimmer deforming in the same manner but at a different rate. We describe this with the mapping

.

Using this mapping, we see that

.

This result means that the net distance traveled by the swimmer does not depend on the rate
at which it is being deformed, but only on the geometrical sequence of shape. This is the first key result.

Symmetry of forward and backward motion
If a swimmer is moving in a periodic fashion that is time invariant, we know that the average displacement during one period must be zero. That means its shape at the start and end are the same, i.e. . Next, we consider motion obtained by time-reversal
Now we find the relationship between the net displacements in these two cases:

.

This is the second key result. Combining with our first key result from the previous section, we see that . We see that a swimmer that reverses its motion by reversing its sequence of shape changes leads to the opposite distance traveled. Thus, the distance traveled should
be the same independently of the direction of time, meaning that reciprocal motion cannot be used for net motion in low Reynolds number environments.

Exceptions
The scallop theorem holds if we assume that a swimmer undergoes reciprocal motion in an infinite quiescent Newtonian fluid in the absence of inertia and external body forces. However, there are instances where the assumptions for the scallop theorem are violated. In one case, successful swimmers in viscous environments must display non-reciprocal body kinematics. In another case, if a swimmer is in a non-Newtonian fluid, locomotion can be achieved as well.

Types of non-reciprocal motion 
In his original paper, Purcell proposed a simple example of non-reciprocal body deformation, now commonly known as the Purcell swimmer. This simple swimmer possess two degrees of freedom for motion: a two-hinged body composed of three rigid links rotating out-of-phase with each other. However, any body with more than one degree of freedom of motion can achieve locomotion as well.

In general, microscopic organisms like bacteria have evolved different mechanisms to perform non-reciprocal motion:

Use of a flagellum, which rotates, pushing the medium backwards — and the cell forwards — in much the same way that a ship's screw moves a ship. This is how some bacteria move; the flagellum is attached at one end to a complex rotating motor held rigidly in the bacterial cell surface
Use of a flexible arm: this could be done in many different ways. For example, mammalian sperm have a flagellum which, whip-like, wriggles at the end of the cell, pushing the cell forward. Cilia are quite similar structures to mammalian flagella; they can advance a cell like paramecium by a complex motion not dissimilar to breast stroke.

Non-Newtonian fluids
The assumption of a Newtonian fluid is essential since Stokes equations will not remain linear and time-independent in an environment that possesses complex mechanical and rheological properties. It is also common knowledge that many living microorganisms live in complex non-Newtonian fluids, which are common in biologically relevant environments. For instance, crawling cells often
migrate in elastic polymeric
fluids.
Non-Newtonian fluids have several properties that can be manipulated to produce small scale locomotion.

First, one such exploitable property is normal
stress differences. These differences will arise from the stretching of the fluid by the flow of
the swimmer. Another exploitable property is stress relaxation. Such time evolution of such stresses contain a memory term, though the extent in which this can be utilized is largely unexplored. Last, non-Newtonian fluids possess viscosities that are dependent on the shear rate. In other words, a swimmer would experience a different Reynolds number environment by altering its rate of motion. Many biologically relevant fluids exhibit shear-thinning, meaning viscosity decreases with shear rate. In such an environment, the rate at which a swimmer exhibits reciprocal motion would be significant as it would no longer be time invariant. This is in stark contrast to what we established where the rate in which a swimmer moves is irrelevant for establishing locomotion. Thus, a reciprocal swimmer can be designed in a non-Newtonian fluid. Qiu et al. (2014) were able to design a micro scallop in a non-Newtonian fluid.

See also 

 Bacterial motility
 Microswimmer
 Protist locomotion

References

External links
 E.M. Purcell. Life at Low Reynolds Number, American Journal of Physics vol 45, p. 3-11 (1977)
Kinematic Reversibility and the Scallop Theorem
 Video of a swimming robot unable to propel in viscous fluid due to the Scallop theorem

Physics theorems
Fluid dynamics
Mathematical and theoretical biology